Land is the eponymous first full-length album by the American group Land.  Land was recorded at Jack Straw Productions in Seattle in 1994 and released by the Australian label Extreme in 1995.  All tracks were composed by Jeff Greinke with the exception of "Shu", which was composed by Greinke and Dennis Rea.

Prior to Land group leader Jeff Greinke's solo albums had been mainly heavily layered and textured ambient music.  With Land Greinke's goal "was to push this layering technique using a four-piece band, although texture continues to be a focus." Chris Nickson, in his Allmusic review, describes LAND, in part, as "...an album that teases, tickles, grates, and always satisfies in its ambition and performance." and adds that Land "...create an organic -- if often electronic -- whole. The textures shift like waves, sometimes quietly, sometimes evoking specific places, such as the bamboo tones of China, on "Shu." "Ku" becomes disquieting with its discordance, but overall this is quite a subdued record."

Track listing
Caravan – 7:54
Bustle - 5:16
Nightnoise - 9:29
Ku - 8:04
Shu - 7:14
Limba - 7:21
Jacks - 6:39
India 9:30

Personnel
Jeff Greinke -  Keyboards, voice, producer.
Ed Pias - Electric & acoustic drums and percussion
Lesli Dalaba - Trumpet, effects
Dennis Rea - Guitar, effects
Tori Nelson-Zagar - Acoustic bass on "Nightnoise"
Scott Granlund - Tenor saxophone on "India"
Doug Haire - mixing on "Jacks"

Notes

References
CD Liner notes
Extreme catalog Land - Land  Last retrieved 15 November 2007.

1995 debut albums
Land (band) albums